The Invisible Wall (Swedish: Den osynliga muren) is a 1944 Swedish war drama film directed by Gustaf Molander and starring Inga Tidblad, Irma Christenson and Karl-Arne Holmsten. It was made at the Råsunda Studios in Stockholm with location shooting around Kävlinge in Scania. The film's sets were designed by the art director Arne Åkermark. It is based on the 1942 novel Assassination in Paris (Attentat i Paris) by Marika Stiernstedt. It was part of a group of films that dealt with the ongoing theme of the German occupation of Norway and Denmark while being set in a notionally unnamed country.

Synopsis 
A young woman working in a travel agency is in a relationship with an officer of the forces occupying her country. However, she also has a friend who is part of a clandestine resistance movement that help smuggle people out of the country who are wanted by the authorities. She becomes involved in this movement, helping Jews and a young woman who killed one of the occupiers and is now being hunted down by them.

Cast
 Inga Tidblad as 	Lina Boyd
 Irma Christenson as 	Marie de Troy
 Karl-Arne Holmsten as 	Stefan Becker
 Erik Hell as Walter Corell
 Stig Järrel as 	Victor Reis
 Håkan Westergren as 	Paul Brandt
 Olof Winnerstrand as 	Prof. Ruben
 Hilda Borgström as 	Mrs. Meijer
 Carl Ström as Brandt Sr.
 Alf Kjellin as Ivan Levy
 Inge Wærn as 	Mirjam Levy
 Hampe Faustman as 	Patrol Commander
 Hugo Björne as Maj. Wolter 
 Britta Brunius as Mrs. Fock
 Rune Carlsten as Interrogator

References

Bibliography 
 Iverson, Gunnar, Soderbergh Widding, Astrid & Soila, Tytti. Nordic National Cinemas. Routledge, 2005.
 Qvist, Per Olov & von Bagh, Peter. Guide to the Cinema of Sweden and Finland. Greenwood Publishing Group, 2000.
 Wright, Rochelle. The Visible Wall: Jews and Other Ethnic Outsiders in Swedish Film. SIU Press, 1998.

External links 
 

1944 films
1944 drama films
Swedish drama films
1940s Swedish-language films
Films directed by Gustaf Molander
Swedish black-and-white films
Films based on Swedish novels
1940s Swedish films